USS Mariner (SP-1136) was a wooden-hulled tugboat for the United States Navy in World War I. She had previously been the Jack T. Scully of the Neptune Line of New York before her acquisition by the Navy. She foundered and sank in a gale on 26 February 1918 while part of a convoy steaming to Bermuda.

History 
Mariner, formerly the steam tug Jack T. Scully of the Neptune Line, New York City, was built in 1899 by A. C. Brown, Tottenville, Staten Island, New York and had previously steamed between New York and Bangor, Maine. Considered “strongly built” and a “good sea boat” for potential employment as a minesweeper, Mariner was delivered to the Navy on 25 September 1917. Earmarked “for distant service” on 1 October 1917 and given the designation SP-1136, she was commissioned at the New York Navy Yard, Brooklyn, New York, on 19 December 1917. The Navy spent $3,000 refitting the tug for naval service.

Initially, Mariner performed routine duty at the New York Navy Yard and in the waters of New York harbor. The little convoy proceeded uneventfully until increasingly heavy ice floes began to impede their progress. Mariner took Wadena in tow, getting her through one congested area and then dropping the tow when clear. When Wadena again ran into difficulty, Mariner took the yacht in tow, until forced to stop (Yacona then took Wadena in tow for a time) when the ice in Long Island Sound smashed in some of her timbers, compelling Lt.(jg) Miller to order the tug beached at New London to facilitate repairs. Once again seaworthy, Mariner steamed up Narragansett Bay to the coaling station at Melville, Rhode Island, where she helped Yacona get underway for Newport during the afternoon watch on 23 February, then proceeded to assist the section patrol boat  that had suffered a fire at Melville later that same day. Mariner then shifted to Newport.

Mariner got underway for Bermuda on 24 February 1918 in company with Yacona and Wadena, the tug , eleven  submarine chasers, and the French tug Mohican. As the convoy worked its way down the eastern seaboard, however, Mariner fell farther behind. She briefly towed the submarine chaser  before the tug herself began to founder in the heavy southwesterly gale that sprang up on 26 February. Her seams opened to the sea by the pounding of the waves, her pumps failed; rising water doused the fires under her boilers and rendered her helpless.

Consequently, Mariner hoisted the breakdown flag shortly before noon and cast loose SC-177. Shortly thereafter, the crew of Mariner signaled that they were sinking fast. Wadena stood by to render assistance, in rough and high seas. After embarking two groups of Mariner’s crew from life rafts, Wadena sprayed oil on the water to calm the seas, and then brought on board the rest of the tug's complement from three more rafts. The last group—which included Lt. (jg.) Miller, Mariner’s commanding officer—had abandoned the tug with its decks awash, and reached Wadena’s side at around 17:30.

While the rest of the convoy continued on its passage, Wadena retrieved SC-177 and ultimately reached the British naval station at Hamilton, Bermuda, on 1 March 1918.

Mariner was stricken from the Navy Register on 8 March 1918.

Notes

References

External links 
 
 Photo gallery at Naval Historical Center

Ships built in Staten Island
World War I auxiliary ships of the United States
Tugs of the United States Navy
1899 ships